Carovilli is a comune (municipality) in the Province of Isernia in the Italian region Molise, located about  northwest of Campobasso and about  northeast of Isernia.

The municipality of Carovilli contains the frazioni (subdivisions, mainly villages and hamlets) Briccioso, Castiglione, Cerrosavino, Fontecurelli, and Pescorvaro.

Carovilli borders the following municipalities: Agnone, Miranda, Pescolanciano, Roccasicura, Vastogirardi.

Demographic evolution

References

Cities and towns in Molise